Paracymoriza vagalis is a moth in the family Crambidae. It was described by Francis Walker in 1866. It is found in China (Zhejiang, Fujian, Guangdong, Guangxi, Guizhou, Yunnan), Taiwan, Japan, Thailand, Indonesia and India.

References

Acentropinae
Moths described in 1866